Relief is an unincorporated community in Morgan County, Kentucky, United States.  It lies along Route 172 east of the city of West Liberty, the county seat of Morgan County.  Its elevation is 732 feet (223 m).

A post office called Relief was established in 1859, and remained in operation until 1983. For the early settlers, the convenience of having a post office in the community was a "relief", hence the name.

References

Unincorporated communities in Morgan County, Kentucky
Unincorporated communities in Kentucky